Greeley station is a former railway station in Greeley, Colorado. It was constructed by Union Pacific Railroad, and is listed on the National Register of Historic Places as the Greeley Union Pacific Railroad Depot. It was designed by Gilbert Stanley Underwood.

Amtrak's San Francisco Zephyr served Greeley until 1983, when Amtrak re-routed the Zephyr off the Union Pacific's Overland Route and on to the Denver & Rio Grande Western main line. This move also ended all service in Wyoming. Service resumed in 1991 when Amtrak started running the Pioneer through Wyoming, but then ended again with the cancellation of the Pioneer in 1997. Greeley was listed on the National Register of Historic Places in 1993.

The building now serves as an office for the Greeley Convention & Visitors Bureau.

See also

 National Register of Historic Places listings in Weld County, Colorado

References

External links

 National Register of Historic Places
 Directory of Colorado State Register Properties
 Greeley Downtown

Greeley, Colorado
Former Union Pacific Railroad stations in Colorado
Railway stations in the United States opened in 1930
Railway stations on the National Register of Historic Places in Colorado
Former Amtrak stations in Colorado
Transportation buildings and structures in Weld County, Colorado
Railway stations closed in 1983
Railway stations in the United States opened in 1991
Railway stations closed in 1997
1930 establishments in Colorado
National Register of Historic Places in Weld County, Colorado